Salan was a 9th-century Bulgarian duke who ruled in the territory of present-day Vojvodina, Serbia.

Salan may also refer to:

 Raoul Salan (1899–1984), general who led the 1961 putsch against the French government in Algeria
 a term for curry in Urdu and other South Asian languages, e.g. Mirchi ka salan.